Greg Lally (born 7 February 1988) is an Irish hurler who currently plays as a midfielder for the Galway senior team.

Born in Gort, County Galway, Lally first played competitive hurling in his youth. He was a key member of the Gort Community School senior team. At club level he is a two-time championship medallist with Gort.

Lally made his debut on the inter-county scene at the age of seventeen when he first linked up with the Galway minor team who won the 2005 All Ireand. An All-Ireland runner-up in this grade in 2006, he later joined the under-21 side. Lally made his senior championship debut during the 2015 championship.

On 3 September 2017, Lally was a substitute for Galway as they won their first All-Ireland Senior Hurling Championship in 29 years against Waterford.

Honours
Gort

 Galway Senior Hurling Championship (2): 2011, 2014

Galway

 All Ireland Minor Hurling Championship (sub) (1) 2005
 All-Ireland Senior Hurling Championship (1): 2017 (sub) 
National Hurling League Division 1 (2): 2010, 2017 (sub) 
Leinster Senior Hurling Championship (3): 2012, 2017 (sub) 2018 (Sub)

References

1988 births
Living people
Gort hurlers
Galway inter-county hurlers